Nunzio Gallo (25 March 1928 – 22 February 2008) was an Italian singer. He was born in Naples and represented his country in the 1957 Eurovision Song Contest, coming 6th. The song he performed, "Corde Della Mia Chitarra", is famous for being the longest song ever played for Eurovision at 5:09 before the new rules came into place. Gallo was also an actor appearing in over 20 films. Gallo suffered severe brain haemorrhage in September 2007 from which he never fully recovered. He died on 22 February 2008 in Telese Terme.

He was the father of actor and singer Massimiliano Gallo.

References

1928 births
2008 deaths
Eurovision Song Contest entrants of 1957
Eurovision Song Contest entrants for Italy
Musicians from Naples
Sanremo Music Festival winners
20th-century Italian male singers